Shaqra is a town in central Saudi Arabia, The city is located about 190 kilometers north-west of the capital Riyadh. It is a small city which is now growing due to the newly opened Shaqra University. The city is peaceful and well designed and most of the daily necessities are available.
Its astronomical location, as it is located at the intersection of latitude 15 and 25 north with longitude 15 and 45 east, so that it occupies an intermediate position between longitude and latitude in the Kingdom of Saudi Arabia, which extends north to latitude 32 and south to latitude 16.

See also 

 List of cities and towns in Saudi Arabia
 Regions of Saudi Arabia
 Shaqra University

References
 

Populated places in Riyadh Province